Brian Edward Patrick Kennedy (born 12 October 1966) is an Irish singer. He scored a number of hit singles and albums in the UK and Ireland during the 1990s and 2000s. He represented Ireland in the Eurovision Song Contest 2006 and finished in 10th place. Brian is the younger brother of the late musician Bap Kennedy.

Career
Kennedy made his debut in 1988 as a chorus on the recordings of Van Morrison, a Northern Irish singer-songwriter. Kennedy came to prominence as one of Van Morrison's backing singers, appearing on a number of his albums, including A Night in San Francisco, Days Like This, The Healing Game and Back on Top and live in concert.

Around this time, he also scored a minor UK hit album of his own with The Great War of Words (1990). This album featured the lead single "Captured" which was a minor hit in both the UK and Irish charts.

In 1991, Kennedy was joined by Mark E. Nevin, formerly of Fairground Attraction, to form the duo Sweetmouth. Their album, Goodbye to Songtown, was released in August 1991 and featured the songs written by Nevin for a second Fairground Attraction album which was never realised.

In the mid-1990s, pop manager Simon Fuller took on Kennedy, signing him to RCA Records for his second solo album which saw greater success. Released in 1996, the album, A Better Man, reached No.19 in the UK and spawned the hit singles "A Better Man" (No.28), "Life Love and Happiness" (No.27) and "Put the Message in a Box" (No.37), which also all became top 20 hits in Ireland. This was followed in 1999 by the album Now That I Know What I Want, which met with less success.

In 2001, he released his fourth album Get On with Your Short Life, which rendered only a No.81 placing for its title track in the UK. Later that year, he performed on the original Secret Garden version of the song "You Raise Me Up", which went on to be recorded by many other artists, such as Josh Groban and Westlife. This was the song he sang at the funeral of the footballer George Best in late 2005. His version was released again in December 2005 and early the following year became his biggest hit, released as the EP "George Best - a Tribute" with Peter Corry. The single reached No.4 in the UK charts and No.3 in Ireland.

Kennedy was chosen as the Irish competitor for the 2006 Eurovision Song Contest in Athens, where he sang the self-penned "Every Song is a Cry for Love". His performance in the contest's semi-finals marked the 1000th song to feature in the history of the Eurovision competition. Following qualification, Kennedy finished tenth in the finals on 20 May, with 93 points. The song also performed well in the Irish charts, becoming a No.4 hit.

Kennedy performed at the opening of new studios for his local station Belfast CityBeat in 2006. In July 2008, he joined the judging panel of the Citybeat Young Star Search, Northern Ireland's biggest kids talent search.

On 23 August 2010, Kennedy played a version of 'Christopher Street' on a small Balcony overlooking Dame Street, Dublin for the music viral show BalconyTV.

Between 2011 and 12, Kennedy was a coach on the first series of The Voice of Ireland. The series screened on RTÉ during the early months of 2012 and Kennedy mentored the eventual runner-up in the final, Richie Hayes.

In October 2018, he started presenting a weekly programme on radio station Tipp FM.

Personal life
Kennedy was born and grew up on the Falls Road in Belfast. As a child he suffered from Osgood–Schlatter disease in each leg. He has described in public the violence of The Troubles, during his childhood and teen years, including seeing a young man being chased and then shot dead by a soldier a few feet away from him. He also would harmonise with police, ambulance and fire engine sirens. Kennedy revealed in 2016 that he was battling rectal cancer.

Kennedy came out as gay before 2009.
>

Discography
 Albums

 Singles

 Other Songs
A cover of "Dry Your Eyes" by The Streets on Even Better than the Real Thing Vol. 2 (2004)
A cover of "Angel (Floating Round this House)" by Kirsty MacColl on The Concert for Kirsty MacColl (2013)

Writing career
The Arrival of Fergal Flynn (Hodder, 2004), a novel
Roman Song (Hodder, 2005), a novel

References

External links
The Brighter Life of Brian The Age
 
Brian Kennedy Youtube Channel
Brian Kennedy on Itunes
 Brian Kennedy Live in the Ardhowen Theatre, Enniskillen.

1966 births
Living people
Eurovision Song Contest entrants of 2006
Eurovision Song Contest entrants for Ireland
Musicians from Belfast
Tenors from Northern Ireland
LGBT singers from Northern Ireland
Male novelists from Northern Ireland
LGBT songwriters from Northern Ireland
Sony Music Publishing artists
Van Morrison
Gay musicians from Northern Ireland
Gay writers from Northern Ireland
The Voice of Ireland
20th-century novelists from Northern Ireland
21st-century novelists from Northern Ireland
LGBT novelists from Northern Ireland
Gay singers
Gay songwriters
Gay novelists